Tamara Drewe is a 2010 British romantic comedy film directed by Stephen Frears. The screenplay was written by Moira Buffini, based on the newspaper comic strip of the same name (which was then re-published as a graphic novel) written by Posy Simmonds. The comic strip which serves as source material was a modern reworking of Thomas Hardy's 1874 novel Far from the Madding Crowd.

The film premiered at the 2010 Cannes Film Festival in May and was released nationwide in France on 14 July 2010. Momentum Pictures released the film in the United Kingdom on 10 September 2010.

Plot 
In the fictitious Dorset village of Ewedown, Tamara Drewe, a young and beautiful journalist, returns home after living in London, with the intention of selling her deceased mother's house, in which she grew up. Locals are amazed at the improvement in her appearance after she had rhinoplasty while away. Andy had been interested in her when she was a girl, and when he sees her now it is clear that he is still attracted to her. However, she begins an affair with rock-band-drummer Ben whom she meets at a music festival held in the village.

Across the valley is a neighbour's home where authors retreat to work. The owner, Nicholas, is a prolific crime novelist and a serial philanderer, while his wife Beth provides food, lodging, and encouragement for her patrons. After being discovered by Beth having an affair which he then ends, Nicholas embarks on an affair with Tamara, after she and Ben have split up. Andy has been asked by Tamara to work on the house so she can sell it, and he becomes aware of the affair with Nicholas, as do two local teenaged schoolgirls (Jody and Casey) who cause some havoc due to their jealousy of Tamara.

Jody is infatuated with Ben and distraught that she won't see him in the village again, because he left Ewedown after he and Tamara split up, so she manipulates him into returning. Eventually her deceit is discovered. Nicholas and Tamara's affair is revealed and in a strange turn of events, Nicholas is accidentally killed by stampeding cows. Beth's friend Glen, a Thomas Hardy scholar who had become infatuated with her over the months he spent there, reveals his love for her despite feeling guilty about Nicholas's demise, which happened after a confrontation between the two. She easily persuades him to remain at the retreat with her. By this time the true love of Andy and Tamara brings them together, and Tamara decides to stay in Ewedown after all.

Cast 
 Gemma Arterton as Tamara Drewe
 Roger Allam as Nicholas Hardiment
 Bill Camp as Glen McCreavy
 Dominic Cooper as Ben Sergeant
 Luke Evans as Andy Cobb
 Tamsin Greig as Beth Hardiment
 Jessica Barden as Jody Long
 Charlotte Christie as Casey Shaw
 John Bett as Diggory
 Josie Taylor as Zoe
 Bronagh Gallagher as Eustacia
 Pippa Haywood as Tess
 Susan Wooldridge as Penny Upminster
 Alex Kelly as Jody's mother
 Lola Frears as Poppy Hardiment
 Joel Fry as Steve Culley
 Cheryl Campbell as Lucetta

Premiere 
The UK premiere was held on 6 September 2010 at the Odeon Leicester Square. Most of the cast and crew were in attendance as well as Lily Allen, Jack Gregson and Stephen Fry.

The public premiere was also held on 6 September 2010, at the National Film Theatre. Most of the cast were in attendance as well as director Stephen Frears, screenwriter Moira Buffini, and book author Posy Simmonds. The film's showing received long applause and was followed by questions to the stars from the audience.

Reception

Box office 
The film grossed $12,037,973.

Critical response 

, the film holds a 65% approval rating on review aggregator Rotten Tomatoes, based on 127 reviews with an average rating of 6.30/10. The website's critics consensus reads: "A robust comedic cast and Stephen Frears' gift for satire elevate Tamara Drewes slight scenario into a tart treat." Metacritic gave it a score of 64 out of 100 based on reviews from 28 critics, indicating 'generally favourable reviews'.

Empire gave four stars out of five stating the film was "Very intelligently funny, with stellar performances." Lisa Mullen wrote in Sight & Sound in September 2010:

Accolades

References

External links 
 Official website (US)
 
Tamara Drewe at Rotten Tomatoes
 Tamara Drewe interviews, BBC Film Network
 Screenplay at BBC writersroom

2010 films
Adultery in films
BBC Film films
British romantic comedy films
Films based on British comics
Films based on comic strips
Live-action films based on comics
Films about writers
Films directed by Stephen Frears
Films set in Dorset
Sony Pictures Classics films
Films based on adaptations
Films scored by Alexandre Desplat
Films produced by Alison Owen
Films based on works by Thomas Hardy
2010s English-language films
2010s British films